Ice Peak is a brand of orange flavored soda produced by Xi'an Futian Foods in Xi'an, Shaanxi Province, China. It is usually consumed with other Shaanxi specialties such as paomo or youpo noodles. Combined with roujiamo sandwich and liangpi, they constitute a popular set meal called the "Xi'an Triangle". The drink is served in most Shaanxi restaurants in China and abroad.

See also
 Jianlibao Group

References

External links
 Ice Peak homepage 

Shaanxi cuisine
Chinese drinks 
Orange sodas